Mansionz (stylized in lowercase) is an American alternative hip hop duo composed of musicians Mike Posner and blackbear. They released their self-titled debut album on March 24, 2017.

History

2016–present: Beginnings and debut album
Mansionz was formed when longtime collaborators Matthew Musto and Mike Posner formally came together as a musical duo in late 2016. At that time, the two musicians were already good friends and had worked together multiple times in the past on singles such as Justin Bieber's "Boyfriend," as well as several of their own tracks. On December 9, 2016, Musto and Posner released their debut single under the name Mansionz, entitled "Stfu." The track features rapper Spark Master Tape and has been described as a "slow R&B serenade". It received mostly positive reviews.

To promote the upcoming release of their album, Mansionz released two YouTube videos, "intro to mansionz part 1" and "intro to mansionz part 2," on January 16, 2017 and January 25, 2017, respectively. Both videos were shot by "Stfu" collaborator Spark Master Tape. In addition, Mansionz released two additional singles titled "Rich White Girls" and "Dennis Rodman," which were released on February 3, 2017 and March 17, 2017, respectively. Musto and Posner promoted the album on the red carpet of the 59th Annual Grammy Awards, where they both sported lime-green hair, a signature look and major aspect of their album's promotion that would come to characterize the duo in the future.

Mansionz, the self titled debut album from Musto and Posner, was released on March 24, 2017 and featured appearances from Soren Bryce, G-Eazy, CyHi The Prynce, and Snoozegod, as well as Spark Master Tape and Dennis Rodman. It received generally positive reviews from critics, although some reviewers who had enjoyed the earlier solo work of Musto and Posner were disappointed.

On March 29, 2017, Mansionz released an official music video for their single "Rich White Girls", starring Amanda Crew and Meredith Hagner as the title characters. It was followed by a music video for "Dennis Rodman," which arrived on May 19, 2017. In June 2017, Mike Posner made a surprise appearance at a Blackbear concert in Detroit on the latter's Digital DrugTour, making it the first official Mansionz concert. The duo performed several songs, including "Dennis Rodman" and "STFU," and teased on Twitter that there would be more to come in 2018. On August 11, 2017, "Wicked" was announced to be the fourth single from Mansionz. A radio edit of "Wicked" was released, as well as remixes of the track by Loote and Rat City. On October 19, 2018 the duo performed three songs officially as Mansionz at Red Rocks Amphitheater in Colorado. They performed "My Beloved," "Dennis Rodman," and "STFU." There, the two teased an upcoming album from the duo.

Members
 Mike Posner - vocals, production
 Matthew "blackbear" Musto - vocals, production

Discography

Studio albums

Singles 

 "Stfu" (feat. Spark Master Tape) (2016)
 "Rich White Girls" (2017)
 "Dennis Rodman" (feat. Dennis Rodman) (2017)
 "Wicked"  (feat. G-Eazy) (2017)

References

2016 establishments in California
American musical duos
American contemporary R&B musical groups
Alternative hip hop groups
Electropop groups
Hip hop duos
Island Records artists
Musical groups established in 2016
Musical groups from Los Angeles